A Fire Upon the Deep is a 1992 science fiction novel by American writer Vernor Vinge. It is a space opera involving superhuman intelligences, aliens, variable physics, space battles, love, betrayal, genocide, and a communication medium resembling Usenet. A Fire Upon the Deep won the Hugo Award in 1993, sharing it with Doomsday Book by Connie Willis.

Besides the normal print book editions, the novel was also included on a CD-ROM sold by ClariNet Communications along with the other nominees for the 1993 Hugo awards. The CD-ROM edition included numerous annotations by Vinge on his thoughts and intentions about different parts of the book, and was later released as a standalone e-book.

Setting
The novel is set in various locations in the Milky Way. The galaxy is divided into four concentric volumes called the "Zones of Thought"; it is not clear to the novel's characters whether this is a natural phenomenon or an artificially produced one, but it seems to roughly correspond with galactic-scale stellar density and a Beyond region is mentioned in the Sculptor Galaxy as well. The Zones reflect fundamental differences in basic physical laws, and one of the main consequences is their effect on intelligence, both biological and artificial. Artificial intelligence and automation is most directly affected, in that advanced hardware and software from the Beyond or the Transcend will work less and less well as a ship "descends" towards the Unthinking Depths. But even biological intelligence is affected to a lesser degree. The four zones are spoken of in terms of "low" to "high" as follows:

 The Unthinking Depths are the innermost zone, surrounding the Galactic Center. In it, only minimal forms of intelligence, biological or otherwise, are possible. This means that any ship straying into the Depths will be stranded, effectively permanently. Even if the crew did not die immediately—and some forms of life native to "higher" Zones would likely do so—they would be rendered incapable of even human intelligence, leaving them unable to operate their ship in any meaningful way.
 Surrounding the Depths is the Slow Zone. The Earth (called "Old Earth") is located in this Zone, and humanity is said to have originated there, although Earth plays no significant role in the story. Biological intelligence is possible in "the Slowness", but not true, sentient, artificial intelligence. Automation is not intelligent enough to calculate the jumps required for faster than light travel in the Slow Zone, but they may escape by performing an immediate reverse jump to where they arrived from if the Slowness is detected, and navigation systems watch for this and store the information required for a return to the start point during each jump. All ships which find themselves in the Slow Zone are restricted to sub-light speeds if an immediate reverse jump back out is impossible. Faster-than-light communication is impossible into or out of the Slow Zone. As the boundaries of the Zones are unknown and subject to change, accidental entry to the Slow Zone is a major interstellar navigational hazard at the "Bottom" of the Beyond.  Starships which operate near the Beyond/Slow Zone border often have an auxiliary Bussard ramjet drive, so that, if they accidentally stray into the Slow Zone (thus disabling any FTL drive), they will at least have a backup (sub-light) drive to push them back "up" to the Beyond. Such ships also tend to include "coldsleep" equipment, as it is likely that any such return will still take many subjective lifetimes for most species.
 The next outermost layer is the Beyond, within which artificial intelligence, faster-than-light travel, and faster-than-light communication are possible. A few human civilizations exist in the Beyond, all descended from a single ethnic Norwegian group which managed to travel from the Slow Zone to the Beyond (presumably at sub-light speeds) and thence spread using FTL travel. The original settlement of this group is known as Nyjora; other human settlements in the Beyond include Straumli Realm and Sjandra Kei. In the Beyond, FTL travel is accomplished by making many small "jumps" across intervening space, and the efficiency of the drive increases the farther a ship travels from the galactic core. This reflects increases in both drive efficiency and the ship's automation's increased capacity as one moves outward, enabling the computation of longer and longer jumps. The Beyond is not a homogeneous zone—many references are made to, e.g., the "High Beyond" or the "Bottom of the Beyond", depending on distance to the galactic core. These terms seem to refer to differences in the Zone itself, not just relative distance from the Core, but there are no obvious Zone boundaries within the Beyond the way there are between the Slow Zone and the Beyond, or between the Beyond and the Transcend. Whereas a ship that crosses from the Beyond to the Slow Zone or vice versa will experience a dramatic change in its capabilities, a ship in the Beyond which moves farther from the Core will experience a gradual increase in efficiency (assuming it has the technology to make use of it) until another major shift at the boundary to the Transcend. The Beyond is populated by a very large number of interstellar and intergalactic civilizations which are linked by a faster-than-light communication network, "the Net", sometimes cynically called the "Net of a Million Lies". The Net does connect with the Transcend, on the off-chance that one of the "Powers" that live there deigns to communicate, but has no connections with the Slow Zone, as FTL communication is impossible into or out of that Zone. In the novel, the Net is depicted as working much like the Usenet network in the early 1990s, with transcripts of messages containing header and footer information as one would find in such forums.
 The outermost layer, containing the galactic halo, is the Transcend, within which incomprehensible, superintelligent beings dwell. When a "Beyonder" civilization reaches the point of technological singularity, it is said to "Transcend", becoming a "Power". Such Powers always seem to relocate to the Transcend, seemingly necessarily, where they become engaged in affairs which remain entirely mysterious to those that remain in the Beyond.

Plot
An expedition from Straumli Realm, an ambitious young human civilization in the high Beyond, investigates a five-billion-year-old data archive in the low Transcend that offers the possibility of unimaginable riches. The expedition's facility, High Lab, is gradually compromised by a dormant superintelligence within the archive later known as the Blight. However, shortly before the Blight's final "flowering", two self-aware entities created similarly to the Blight plot to aid the humans before the Blight can escape.

Recognizing the danger of what they have awakened, the researchers at High Lab attempt to flee in two ships, one carrying all the adults and the second carrying all the children in "coldsleep boxes". Suspicious, the Blight discovers that the first ship contains a data storage device in its cargo manifest; assuming it contains information that could harm it, the Blight destroys the ship. The second ship escapes. The Blight assumes that it is no threat, but later realizes that it is actually carrying away a "countermeasure" against it.

The ship lands on a distant planet with a medieval-level civilization of dog-like creatures, dubbed "Tines", who live in packs as group minds. Upon landing, however, the two surviving adults are ambushed and killed by Tine fanatics known as Flenserists, in whose realm they have landed. The Flenserists capture a young boy named Jefri Olsndot and his wounded sister, Johanna. While Jefri is taken deeper into Flenserist territory, Johanna is rescued by a Tine pilgrim who witnessed the ambush and delivers her to a neighboring kingdom ruled by a Tine named Woodcarver. The Flenserists tell Jefri that Johanna had been killed by Woodcarver and exploit him in order to develop advanced technology (such as cannon and radio communication), while Johanna and the knowledge stored in her "dataset" device help Woodcarver rapidly develop in turn.

A distress signal from the sleeper ship eventually reaches "Relay", a major node in the galactic communications network. A benign transcendent entity named "the Old One" contacts Relay, seeking information about the Blight and the humans who released it, and reconstitutes a human man named Pham Nuwen from an old wreck to act as its agent, using his doubt of his own memory's veracity to bend him to the Old One's will.  Ravna Bergsndot, the only human Relay employee, traces the sleeper ship's signal to the Tines' world and persuades her employer to investigate what the human ship took from High Lab, contracting the merchant vessel Out of Band II, owned by two sentient plant "Skroderiders", Blueshell and Greenstalk, to transport them.

Before the mission is launched, the Blight attacks Relay and concurrently kills Old One. As Old One dies, it downloads what information it can into Pham to defeat the Blight, and Pham, Ravna and the Skroderiders barely escape Relay's destruction in the Out of Band II.

The Blight expands, taking over races and "rewriting" their people to become its agents, murdering several other Powers, and seizing other archives in the Beyond, looking for what was taken. It finally realizes where the danger truly lies and sends a hastily assembled fleet in pursuit of the Out of Band II.

The humans arrive at the Tines' homeworld and ally with Woodcarver to defeat the Flenserists. Pham initiates Countermeasure, which extends the Slow Zone by thousands of light years, enveloping the Blight at the cost of wrecking thousands of uninvolved civilizations and causing trillions of deaths.  The humans are stranded on the Tines world, now in the depths of the "Slow Zone". Activating the countermeasure costs Pham his life, but just before Pham dies, he realizes that, although his body is a reconstruction, his memories are real. Vinge expands on Pham's background story in A Deepness in the Sky.

Intelligent species

Aprahanti
A race of humanoids with colorful butterfly-like wings who attempt to use the chaos wrought by the Blight to reestablish their waning hegemony. Despite their attractive, delicate appearance, the Aprahanti are an extremely fearsome and vicious species.

Blight
An ancient, malevolent super-intelligent entity which strives to constantly expand and can easily manipulate electronics and even organic beings.

Dirokimes
An older race which originally inhabited Sjandra Kei before the arrival of humanity.

Humans
All humans in the novel (except Pham) are descended from Nyjoran stock. Their ancestors were "Tuvo-Norsk" asteroid miners from Old Earth's solar system, which is noted as being on the other side of the galaxy in the Slow Zone. (Nyjora sounds similar to New Norwegian "New Earth".) One of the major human habitations is Sjandra Kei, three systems comprising roughly 28 billion individuals. Their main language is Samnorsk, the Norwegian term for a hypothetical unification of the Bokmål and Nynorsk forms of the language. (Vinge indicates in the book's dedication that several key ideas in it came to him while at a conference in Tromsø, Norway.)

Skroders/Riders/Skroderiders
A race of plantlike beings with fronds that are used for expression. The riders have no native capacity for short-term memory. Five billion years ago, someone gave the species wheeled mechanical constructs ("skrodes") to move around and to provide short-term memory. It is later revealed that their "benefactor" was the Blight, and it is able to corrupt and remotely operate the Riders via their skrodes.

Tines
A race of group minds: each person is a "pack" of 4–8 doglike members, which communicate within the pack using very short-range ultrasonic waves from drumlike organs called "tympana".
Each "soul" can survive and evolve by adding members to replace those who die, potentially for hundreds of years, as Woodcarver does.

Kalir
A race of butterfly-like insectoids, authoritarian and warlike, who constitute one of the "majority races" of the Vrinimi organization.

Related works
Vinge first used the concepts of "Zones of Thought" in a 1988 novella The Blabber, which occurs after Fire. Vinge's novel A Deepness in the Sky (1999) is a prequel to A Fire Upon the Deep set 20,000 years earlier and featuring Pham Nuwen. Vinge's The Children of the Sky, "a near-term sequel to A Fire Upon the Deep, set ten years later, was released in October 2011.

Vinge's former wife, Joan D. Vinge, has also written stories in the Zones of Thought universe, based on his notes. These include "The Outcasts of Heaven Belt", "Legacy", and (as of 2008) a planned novel featuring Pham Nuwen.

Title
Vinge's original title for the novel was "Among the Tines"; its final title was suggested by his editors.

Awards and nominations
A Fire Upon the Deep shared the 1993 Hugo Award for Best Novel with Doomsday Book. The book was nominated for the Nebula Award for Best Novel of 1992, the 1993 John W. Campbell Memorial Award for Best Science Fiction Novel, and the 1993 Locus Award for Best Science Fiction Novel.

Critical reactions
Jo Walton wrote: "Any one of the ideas in A Fire Upon the Deep would have kept an ordinary writer going for years. For me it's the book that does everything right, the example of what science fiction does when it works. ... A Fire Upon the Deep remains a favourite and a delight to re-read, absorbing even when I know exactly what’s coming."

References

External links
 
 
 A Fire Upon the Deep at Worlds Without End

1992 American novels
Hugo Award for Best Novel-winning works
Transhumanist books
Usenet
Novels by Vernor Vinge
1992 science fiction novels
Tor Books books
Artificial intelligence in fiction
Malware in fiction
Nanotechnology in fiction
Fiction about consciousness transfer
Apocalyptic fiction